Bob Moore (1932–2021) was an American session musician.

Bob Moore may also refer to:

 Bob Moore (American football) (born 1949), American football tight end
 Bob Moore (Australian footballer) (1872–1938), Australian footballer for Melbourne
 Bob Moore (Irish footballer), 1887 Irish international footballer
 Bob Moore (gambler) (c. 1953–1997), New Zealand horse bettor
 Bob Moore (politician) (1923–2011), member of the Queensland Legislative Assembly
 Bob Moore, Canadian film producer, head of business and legal affairs at EyeSteelFilm
 R. I. Moore (born 1941), British historian
 Bob Moore, founder of Bob's Red Mill

See also
 Robert Moore (disambiguation)
 Bobby Moore (disambiguation)